Route 118 or Highway 118 can refer to multiple roads:

Argentina
 National Route 118

Canada
  British Columbia Highway 118
  New Brunswick Route 118
  Nova Scotia Highway 118
  Ontario Highway 118
  Prince Edward Island Route 118

Costa Rica
 National Route 118

India
 National Highway 118 (India)

Japan
 Route 118 (Japan)

United Kingdom
  East London A118

United States
  U.S. Route 118 (former)
  Alabama State Route 118
  Arkansas Highway 118
  California State Route 118
  Connecticut Route 118
  Georgia State Route 118
  Illinois Route 118 (former)
  Indiana State Road 118 (former)
  Kentucky Route 118
  Louisiana Highway 118
  Maine State Route 118
  Maryland Route 118
  Massachusetts Route 118
  M-118 (Michigan highway) (former)
  Minnesota State Highway 118 (former)
  Missouri Route 118
  Nevada State Route 118
  New Hampshire Route 118
  New Mexico State Road 118
  New York State Route 118
  County Route 118 (Erie County, New York)
  County Route 118 (Herkimer County, New York)
  County Route 118 (Rockland County, New York)
  County Route 118A (Rockland County, New York)
  County Route 118 (Wayne County, New York)
  North Carolina Highway 118
  Ohio State Route 118
  Pennsylvania Route 118
  Rhode Island Route 118
  South Carolina Highway 118
  Tennessee State Route 118
  Texas State Highway 118
  Texas State Highway Loop 118
  Texas State Highway Spur 118
  Farm to Market Road 118
  Utah State Route 118
  Vermont Route 118
  Virginia State Route 118
  Virginia State Route 118 (1924-1928) (former)
  Virginia State Route 118 (1928-1933) (former)
  Wisconsin Highway 118

Territories
  Puerto Rico Highway 118

See also

D118 road
P118, a state regional road in Latvia
R118 road (Ireland)
S118 (Amsterdam)